The climate of Scotland is mostly temperate and oceanic (Köppen climate classification Cfb), and tends to be very changeable, but rarely extreme. It is warmed by the Gulf Stream from the Atlantic, and given its northerly latitude it is much warmer than areas on similar latitudes, for example Kamchatka in Russia or Labrador in Canada (where the sea freezes over in winter), or Fort McMurray, Canada (where  is not uncommon during winter). Scots sometimes describe weather which is grey and gloomy using the Scots language word dreich.

Temperature 
Scotland occupies the cooler northern section of Great Britain, so temperatures are generally lower than in the rest of the British Isles, with the coldest ever UK temperature of  recorded at Braemar in the Grampian Mountains, on 10 January 1982 and also at Altnaharra, Highland, on 30 December 1995. In general, the western coastal areas of Scotland are warmer than the east and inland areas, due to the influence of the Atlantic currents, and the colder surface temperatures of the North Sea.
For the last 100 years, the coldest winter was in 1963 (average temperature ) and the mildest was in 1989 (average ). The warmest summer was in 2003 (average ) and the coolest was in 1922 (average ).

Rainfall  

Due to the mountainous topography of the western Highlands, this type of precipitation is orographic in nature, with the warm, wet air forced to rise on contact with the mountainous coast, where it consequently cools and condenses, forming clouds. In comparison, much of eastern Scotland receives less than  annually; lying in the rain shadow of the western uplands. This effect is most pronounced along the coasts of Lothian, Fife, Angus and eastern Aberdeenshire, as well as around the city of Inverness. Inchkeith in the Firth of Forth receives only  of precipitation each year, which is similar to Rabat in Morocco, and less than Barcelona receives per year. Also, as a result of this the north-western coast has about 265 days with rain a year and this falls to the south east to a minimum of about 170 days along the coast to the east of high ground.
Snowfall is less common in the lowlands, but becomes more common with altitude. Parts of the Highlands have an average of 36 to 105 snow days per year, while some western coastal areas have between 12 and 17 days with snow a year.

Sunshine 
The maximum amount of sunshine in a calendar month was 329 hours in Tiree in May 1946 and again in May 1975 while the minimum, a mere 36 minutes, was recorded at Cape Wrath in the Highlands in January 1983. Dundee and Aberdeen are the sunniest cities in Scotland. On the longest day of the year there is no complete darkness over the northern isles of Scotland. Lerwick, Shetland, has about four hours more daylight at midsummer than London, although this is reversed in midwinter. Annual average sunshine totals vary from as little as 711–1140 hours in the highlands and the north-west, up to 1471–1540 hours on the extreme eastern and south-western coasts. Average annual sunshine hours over the whole territory are 1160 (taking 1971 to 2000 as standard) meaning that the sun shines just over 25% of the time.

Winds 
Scotland is the windiest country in Europe due to eastward moving Atlantic depressions that bring strong winds and clouds continuously throughout the year. In common with the rest of the United Kingdom, wind prevails from the south-west. The windiest areas of Scotland are in the north and west; parts of the Western Isles, Orkney and Shetland have over 30 days with gale force winds per year. Vigorous Atlantic depressions, also known as European windstorms, are a common feature in the autumn and winter in Scotland.

Climate change

References